This is a list of people whose deaths were caused by, or in relation to an interaction with non-military law enforcement officers in Canada. The list includes deaths caused by officers both on and off duty, and does not discriminate by method or motivation.

This list is incomplete; there are no official statistics on fatal shootings by law enforcement officers in Canada, though the range had previously been estimated to be between 15 and 25 per year. In 2018, The CBC published "Deadly Force", an investigative report described as "the first country-wide database of every person who died or was killed during a police intervention", which documented 461 fatal police encounters in Canada between 2000 and 2017, suggesting the average is closer to 26 people a year. "Deadly Force" also recorded an increasing average yearly number of police-involved deaths over time. At the moment, Statistics Canada only tracks fatal police shootings if the officer involved is criminally charged.

List

Before 1980

1980-1999

2000s

2010s

2020s

See also
Lists of killings by law enforcement officers

References

 
 
Canada